Tatlısu can refer to:

 Tatlısu, Erzincan
 Tatlısu, Sungurlu
 Tatlısu Halk Odası Beylerbeyi S.K.
 the Turkish name for Akanthou